Ruud Gullit Sagaf Yunus (born 9 December 1992)  is Indonesian footballer who currently plays for PSIS Semarang as a midfielder.

Career

Martapura FC 
Ruud Gullit  started his professional football career at Liga Indonesia First Division side Martapura FC on 2013. He led Martapura FC promote to Liga Indonesia Premier Division. Having time to join PSMS Medan in 2014 season, he move back to Martapura FC on 2015 season.

PSIS Semarang 
He made his competitive debut on 11 May 2017 in a Liga 2 clash versus PSIR Rembang. He helped the club promote to Liga 1 in December 2017 after winning 6–4 over his ex-club Martapura FC. Shortly after that match, His contract was extended to 2019 .

Personal life 
Gullit's father idolized Dutch Ruud Gullit and even chose Ruud Gullit's name as a prayer so that later on, his son could be as same as the Dutch football legend. Gullit is also the only one in the family who pursue a career as a footballer. Gullit's two older brothers were named 'standard' by his father, Zulkifli and Muhammad Irfan. According to Gullit, At first his name was a burden, because it always attracted people's attention. But over time, Gullit realized that the name is a father's prayer also, every time he appeared on the football pitch.

Typical 
According to the coach of Subangkit, Ruud Gullit has a breaker role and could be an alternative when the defensive midfielder player, Ahmad Agung and Saddam Sudarma was absent.

References

External links
Ruud Gullid Sagaf Yunus

1992 births
Living people
Indonesian footballers
People from Ternate
Sportspeople from North Maluku
Liga 2 (Indonesia) players
Liga 1 (Indonesia) players
PSMS Medan players
PSIS Semarang players
Association football midfielders